Mattia Turetta (born 26 February 1984) is an Italian professional footballer.

Career
Grew up in Torreglia, Padova and Brescia. Debuts with Brescia in 2003 UEFA Intertoto Cup against Gloria Bistriţa. In 2008, he was promoted to Serie B with Sassuolo. In February 2012 moves to Este in Serie D. February 20, 2014 signing up for the Campodarsego in Eccellenza. In August 2014 moves to Mestrino in Promozione (14-15) and Eccellenza (15-16). In summer 2016 moves to Sitland Rivereel (Barbarano Vicentino) in Promozione. In summer 2017 moves to Thermal Teolo in Promozione. In dicembre 2017 moves to Janus Nova 2017 (Selvazzano Dentro) in Prima Categoria. In 2019 moves to Le Torri Bertesina (Torri di Quartesolo) in Prima Categoria. In 2021 moves to Le Montegrotto Terme in Prima Categoria.

References

External links
 Profile at Legaseriea.it 
 
 Profile at Fullsoccer.eu 
 Profile at Laseried.com 
 Profile at Tuttocampo.it 

1984 births
Living people
Italian footballers
Calcio Padova players
Association football midfielders
Sportspeople from Padua
Footballers from Veneto